List of the rulers of the Bamum people, an ethnic group located in Cameroon.  Their capital Fumban is also spelled Foumban in some sources.

(Dates in italics indicate de facto continuation of office.)

Mfon = Ruler

See also 
Cameroon
Politics of Cameroon
Heads of state of Cameroon
Colonial heads of Cameroon British Cameroon (Cameroons)
Heads of government of Cameroon (Cameroons)
Colonial heads of French Cameroon (Cameroun)
Heads of government of French Cameroon (Cameroun)
Colonial heads of German Cameroon (Kamerun)
Rulers of Mandara
Lists of office-holders

References
DeLancey, Mark W., and Mokeba, H. Mbella (1990) Historical Dictionary of the Republic of Cameroon (2nd ed.) Scarecrow Press, Metuchen, N.J.,  ;

Neba, Aaron (1999) Modern Geography of the Republic of Cameroon (3rd ed.) Neba Publishers, Bamenda

Cameroon history-related lists
Cameroonian traditional rulers
Lists of African rulers